The Nowy Dwór Mazowiecki train disaster was a railway disaster that occurred in Nowy Dwór Mazowiecki on October 22, 1949.

Events
A passenger train between Gdańsk and Warsaw derailed, killing 200 people. The Communist officials never mentioned the event in Nowy Dwór Mazowiecki, and the Polish authorities never confirmed the occurrence of any such event.

Information on the accident was reported by the Associated Press, and syndicated in a large number of regional newspapers in the US such as the Gettysburg Times, Geneva Daily Times, Reading Eagle, The Singapore Free Press, and the Great Falls Tribune. Some reports cited an "unofficial but reliable" source.

See also
 Rzepin train disaster, another train disaster in Poland that was not confirmed by Polish authorities.

References

Derailments in Poland
Railway accidents in 1949
1949 in Poland
1949 disasters in Poland